McKinley Brewer (April 12, 1896 – September 23, 1955) was an American baseball pitcher and left fielder in the Negro leagues. He played with Jewell's ABCs in 1919 and the Chicago Giants in 1921. In some sources, he is listed as Luther Brewer.

References

External links
 and Baseball-Reference Black Baseball stats and Seamheads

Chicago Giants players
1896 births
1955 deaths
Baseball players from Indiana
Baseball pitchers
Baseball outfielders
20th-century African-American sportspeople